Events from the year 1900 in Sweden

Incumbents
 Monarch – Oscar II 
 Prime Minister – Erik Gustaf Boström, Fredrik von Otter

Events
27 April – The city plan for Kiruna, Sweden is adopted.
Date unknown – The newspaper Västerbottens-Kuriren is established.
Date unknown – Maternity leave for female industrial workers.
Date unknown – The Swedish branch of the Woman's Christian Temperance Union is organized by Emilie Rathou.
Date unknown – The Malmö Women's Discussion Club, is founded by Elma Danielsson in Malmö.

Births

 16 January – Helge Gustafsson, gymnast (died 1981).
 29 July – Eyvind Johnson, writer (died 1976)
 29 August – Åke Bergqvist, sailor (died 1975).
 26 October – Karin Boye, poet and novelist (died 1941)
 30 October – Ragnar Granit, physiologist (died 1991)

Deaths
 2 April – Gustaf Åkerhielm, prime minister  (born 1833)
 21 July - Aurore Storckenfeldt, reform pedagogue   (born 1816)
 10 December –  Betty Linderoth, watchmaker  (born 1822)
 31 December – Oscar Alin, historian and politician  (born 1846)

References

External links

 
Sweden
Years of the 19th century in Sweden